John Gill ("J.G.") Lemmon (January 2, 1831 or 1832, Lima, Michigan – November 24, 1908 Oakland, California) was an American botanist and Civil War veteran and former prisoner of Andersonville. He was married to fellow botanist, Sara Plummer Lemmon, and the two jointly cataloged numerous western and desert plants.

Biography 
Lemmon was born in Lima, Michigan, on January 2, in 1831 or 1832, to William Lemmon and Amila Hudson Lemmon, a descendant of Henry Hudson the explorer.

He was a schoolteacher for eight years, before attending the University of Michigan. He enlisted in the Union Army in June, 1862, and was involved in numerous engagements in the American Civil War. In August, 1864, Lemmon was captured by the Confederates, and subsequently held as a prisoner of war in the Florence prison and the notorious Andersonville prison.

After being freed on March 1, 1865, he moved to Sierraville, California, to stay with family while he recuperated. He returned to teaching, and acquired an interest in botany. Lemmon began corresponding with Henry Bolander at the California Academy of Sciences and Asa Gray at Harvard University, as he identified more hitherto uncataloged plants. It was only botanical work that gave him solace from the horrors of Andersonville prison. Gray named the new genus Plummera, now called Hymenoxys, in his wife's honor. Eventually, he became known as "the botanist of the West".

While visiting Santa Barbara on a collecting and lecture expedition, Lemmon met Sara Plummer, a transplanted East Coast artist and intellectual who had also developed an interest in botany. The two corresponded for several years, marrying in 1880. They took a "botanical wedding trip" to Arizona in 1881, cataloging many desert and mountain plants, and climbed to the peak of the mountain they christened Mount Lemmon, after Sara, the first European-descended woman to make that ascent.

On their return, they continued their botanical activities, ultimately establishing the Lemmon Herbarium, now part of UC Berkeley's University and Jepson Herbaria. J.G. and Sara lived and established their herbarium at No. 5985 Telegraph Avenue. From 1888 to 1892, J.G. also served as the state botanist for the California State Board of Forestry.

J.G. died November 24, 1908, in Oakland, California, preceding Sara in death by 15 years. He and Sara are buried at Mountain View Cemetery, in Oakland, Plot Section 46.

Selected papers
 John Gill Lemmon, Recollections of Rebel Prisons
 --. Ferns of the Pacific Including Arizona (1882)
 --. Handbook of West American Cone-Bearers (1900)
 --. Conebearers
 --. Oaks of the Pacific Slope (1902)
 --. Discovery of the Potato in Arizona (1883)
 --. Pacific Coast Flowers and Ferns (1880)
 -- and Sara Allen Plummer Lemmon, How to Tell the Trees and Forest Endowment of Pacific Slope (1902)

References

External links

 

1830s births
1908 deaths
People of Michigan in the American Civil War
University of Michigan alumni
American botanists
Union Army soldiers
American Civil War prisoners of war
Writers from California
Writers from Michigan